Hamilton Bus Station is a bus station that serves Hamilton, a large town in South Lanarkshire, Scotland.

Overview
Managed by the Strathclyde Partnership for Transport, Hamilton Bus Station is ideally situated. It is next to the two Hamilton shopping malls, New Cross and Regent (both of which are located in the heart of Hamilton Town Centre), and is located within a densely populated area (around 350,000 live within  of the station). The travel centre is also located across from the entrance to the station. As well as this, the towns main railway station, Hamilton Central, is situated right next to the bus station cafe, offering daily services to stations such as Glasgow Central and Edinburgh Waverley.

Hamilton bus station is operational 24 hours a day. The station is also equipped with telephone boxes, toilets and a taxi rank, as well as 24-hour CCTV monitoring. There are also monitor displays inside the travel centre notifying arrivals/departures. The bus station is wheelchair accessible, and there is car-parking located to the west of the station.

There are a wide range of bus companies that stop at any of the 16 stands at the station, some of which travel nationwide. Some of them include First Glasgow, Stagecoach West Scotland and National Express.

Renovations
On 18 March 2010, South Lanarkshire Council approved a major upgrade on Hamilton Bus station which would modernize the station and improve the links to the station with the nearby railway station and taxi rank. Also included were 14 bus stances, 3 coach stances, installation of electronic information screens, extra parking spaces and waiting areas. The upgrade got underway in late 2011, and work lasted for over a year.

References

External links
 SPT's Hamilton bus station page

Buildings and structures in Hamilton, South Lanarkshire
Bus stations in Scotland
Transport in South Lanarkshire